Castle Point Lighthouse, located near the village of Castlepoint in the Wellington Region of the North Island of New Zealand, is the North Island's tallest lighthouse standing 52 metres above sea level and is one of only two left in New Zealand with a rotating beam. It is owned and operated by Maritime New Zealand.

History 
The light was built in 1913 and was originally fueled by oil. It was officially lit for the first time on Sunday 12 January 1913, sending out a triple flash every 45 seconds that could be seen for 35 kilometres. In 1954 the oil lamp was replaced with an electric one powered by a local diesel generator. This was subsequently replaced by a connection to the mains grid in 1961. The nearby Castlepoint beach is popular with holiday makers and the lighthouse itself became a popular tourist attraction, acquiring the nickname "The Holiday Light".

The light was fully automated in 1988 and is now managed from a central control room in Wellington.

See also 

 List of lighthouses in New Zealand

References

External links 

 
 Lighthouses of New Zealand Maritime New Zealand
 http://paperspast.natlib.govt.nz/cgi-bin/paperspast?a=d&d=NA19220410.1.5&e=-------10--1----0-- "The Northern Advocate" scan from 10 April 1922
 castlepointlighthouse.com

Lighthouses completed in 1913
Lighthouses in New Zealand
Buildings and structures in the Wairarapa
Tourist attractions in the Wellington Region
1913 establishments in New Zealand
1910s architecture in New Zealand
Transport buildings and structures in the Wellington Region